The 1945 Southern Jaguars football team was an American football team that represented Southern University as a member of the Southwestern Athletic Conference (SWAC) during the 1945 college football season. In their 10th season under head coach Ace Mumford, the Jaguars compiled a 6–3–1 record and outscored opponents by a total of 195 to 111.

The team played its home games at University Stadium in Scotlandville, Louisiana (which has since been annexed into the Baton Rouge city limits).

Schedule

References

Southern
Southern Jaguars football seasons
Southern Jaguars football